The Polish Press Agency (PAP) is Poland's national news agency, producing and distributing political, economic, social, and cultural news as well as events information. It was founded in 1918 as Polish Telegraphic Agency (PAT).

PAP serves print media, online, radio and TV, as well as government offices and private businesses. It has 14 news desks in its headquarters in Warsaw and 24 regional bureaux.

As of 2013, the agency had nearly 500 employees and associates, including 300 journalists in Warsaw, 70 regional correspondents, 40 photojournalists and 30 foreign correspondents (among others in Berlin, Brussels, Kiev, London, Madrid, Moscow, New York, Paris, Rome, Sofia, Stockholm, Washington and Vilnius).

In 2019 PAP announced plans to extend its foreign correspondent network to additional countries in Europe, Caucasus, Latin America and Southeast Asia in order to expand its presence in Central European and global markets.

According to the company's website, its content reaches 96.5% of Polish Internet users via online media. In 2022, it had a turnover of 56.6 million PLN.

History 

Polska Agencja Prasowa S.A. was incorporated in 1918 as the Polish Telegraphic Agency (Polska Agencja Telegraficzna, PAT) which makes it one of the world's oldest wire services. PAT ran 14 news bulletins in several languages. In 1925, it launched a regular newsreel and offered a photo service since the 1930s.

In 1944, following the Soviet entry into German-occupied Poland, the company was taken over by the Polish communists and set up under its current name as the local alternative to the still functioning Polish Telegraphic Agency loyal to the Polish government in exile from 1939 in Paris and London. During the reign of communism in Poland, PAP was a government institution and the official communist mouthpiece. In 1990 after the collapse of the Soviet Union and the fall of communism in Europe, the company was reformed and in 1991 the original PTA was finally merged into PAP to form the present-day Agency.

PAP has gradually expanded the number of its news desks, journalists and correspondents. In 1993, the agency launched satellite transmission of its services and started online news distribution in 1995. In 2001, it joined the European Pressphoto Agency (EPA). In the early 2000s, on top of its regular international coverage, PAP had field reporters covering the war in Iraq.

Since 2019, PAP owns Detektyw (The Detective) - a popular monthly magazine on crime that the agency has taken over along with the state owned PWR publishing company.

Services

Polish language services 
The Daily News Service is updated on seven-days-a-week basis, 24 hours a day, and offers around 1000 articles everyday, mainly on politics, business, economy, foreign affairs, sports, science and education.

The business service is prepared by a team of 35 financial editors and several dozen reporters, supported by numerous domestic and foreign correspondents. It covers more than 1000 capital market entities and provides over 100 news items a day.

Multimedia 
PAP-Photo produces and distributes the Daily Photographic Service that offers around 200-300 photos from across Poland and about 1000 images from around the world thanks to the cooperation with the European Pressphoto Agency (EPA), with a large archive of photographs available.

It also provides video content and infographics service in the form of charts, tables, diagrams, maps, 3D animations and interactive graphics.

Other language services 
The Daily News Service is also available in English and Russian. The English service brings major political, economic, social and cultural coverage from Poland and is compiled from PAP regular news service by a team of editors and translators.

In 2022, PAP launched a Ukrainian-language service in response to the Russian invasion of Ukraine and the resulting influx of refugees.

TheFirstNews.pl 
In May 2018, PAP launched an English-language news portal called Thefirstnews.com that focuses mainly on events in Poland, claiming that international media did not always portray the country "entirely accurately" and with the goal of reaching "specific opinion-forming circles" with the help of social media."

Dzieje.pl 
In cooperation with the Museum of Polish History, PAP has been running an educational portal Dzieje.pl, updated daily. It has published tens of thousands of articles on history and over 11 thousand photographs.

Notable journalists 

For many years the celebrated travel writer Ryszard Kapuściński worked as a field reporter for PAP; his posting as the agency's first Africa correspondent provided the material and inspiration for many of his later writings.

Many other prominent Polish journalists and intellectuals worked for PAP at some point of their careers. That includes Wojciech Jagielski who has won acclaim for his reportage from conflict zones in the Transcaucasus, the Caucasus, Central Asia and Africa, renowned lexicographer and publisher Władysław Kopaliński, author, war correspondent and Poland's ambassador to India Krzysztof Mroziewicz, travel writer and sailor Leonid Teliga as well as journalist, columnist and essayist Leopold Unger who reported for the agency from Havana during the Cuban Missile Crisis of 1962.

In popular culture 
PAP was mentioned in a 2018 animated film Another Day of Life by Raúl de la Fuente and Damian Nenow. The film is based on Kapuściński's autobiographical account, Another Day of Life.

See also 
 Polish Telegraphic Agency

References

External links
 http://www.pap.pl homepage

1944 establishments in Poland
News agencies based in Poland